Acuff-Rose Music, Inc. was an American music publishing firm formed in 1942 by Roy Acuff and Fred Rose in Nashville, Tennessee, United States. Acuff-Rose's honest behavior towards their writers set them apart from other music publishing firms at the time and led them to fame throughout the 1950s, 1960s, and 1970s. Currently, the company's catalog is owned by Sony Music Publishing (US), LLC (Delaware).

Early history
Acuff-Rose was formed by country music performer Roy Acuff and Fred Rose, a major Nashville music-industry figure and songwriter, who had a respected ability as a talent scout. Many country performers had been badly cheated in the past with regard to copyright and other rights to their creations. Many were unsophisticated and naive and were taken advantage of by unscrupulous agents, attorneys, record promoters, record labels and others. When they started their publishing company, a condition to the gentleman's agreement between Acuff and Rose was that "our company would be honest.  The writers would always be taken care of.  No one would act in a shady way." Acuff-Rose Publications, Inc. was affiliated with BMI, while Milene Music, Inc. handled music from ASCAP member composers. Both firms initiated business in 1943 with Fred Rose compositions; Acuff-Rose Publications, Inc. copyrighted four songs (under Rose's pseudonym 'Floyd Jenkins') on January 28, while Milene Music, Inc., published "We Live In Two Different Worlds" in July.

Acuff-Rose had its headquarters on 8th Avenue South in the Melrose district of Nashville and was something of a landmark to those knowledgeable of the music industry. It was here that Hank Williams, to prove his ability to Rose, wrote what would become a major hit ("A Mansion on the Hill") while Rose went out to a nearby restaurant for a cup of coffee. Williams proved to be a significant signing, by subsequently releasing a string of both country, and pop hits.

Catalog growth, 1954–1984
On Fred Rose's death in 1954, his son Wesley Rose served as president of Acuff-Rose. Wesley Rose led the publishing company for the next 30 years. He was instrumental not only in the success of Acuff-Rose but also in the growth of country music outside the U.S., being the first country music publisher to establish offices overseas. Acuff-Rose Music flourished throughout this period. Lefty Frizzell, Felice and Boudleaux Bryant, Roy Orbison, Don Gibson, The Everly Brothers, Mickey Newbury, Dallas Frazier, and Whitey Shafer were some of the significant songwriters signed exclusively to Acuff-Rose in the 1950s, 1960s and early 1970s.

Acuff-Rose Music also operated a record label, Hickory Records, Inc., until 1987. It still exists as an assumed name of the parent corporation (see below).

Sale to Gaylord Entertainment Group, Sony/ATV
Recognizing the frailty of their health and that the company he and Fred Rose had founded in 1942 was in steady decline, Roy Acuff approached Wesley Rose late in 1984 and suggested that it was time to sell the catalog. They did not have to look very far for a buyer.  By May 1985, Grand Ole Opry parent company Gaylord Entertainment Company purchased the catalogue for $15 million. The company returned to prominence during this time under the guidance of Music Row veterans Jerry Bradley and Troy Tomlinson and acquired Tom Collins Music.  However, finding itself in need of cash in order to complete construction of one of its trademark convention hotels in Texas, Gaylord sold the publishing company to Sony/ATV Music Publishing in 2002.  Sony/ATV Music Publishing had previously purchased Acuff-Rose's main Music Row rival, Tree International.  The combined catalogs continue to dominate the country music publishing industry. In 2007, Sony/ATV Music Nashville became the first publisher in history to capture BMI Country Music Publisher of the Year, ASCAP Country Music Publisher of the Year, SESAC Country Music Publisher of the Year, and Billboard Country Music Publisher of the Year.

Campbell v. Acuff-Rose Music, Inc.
Acuff-Rose Music was involved in a landmark copyright infringement case in the 1990s: Campbell v. Acuff-Rose Music, Inc. (510 U.S. 569; 1994). In dispute was the use by rap artist Luther Campbell (then using the alias "Luke Skyywalker") and his band 2 Live Crew of a substantial amount of the Roy Orbison hit song "Oh, Pretty Woman" in a parody. Claiming their version of the song fell under the fair use doctrine of the Copyright Act of 1976, 17 U.S.C. 107, Campbell prevailed in the United States district court in Nashville. However, this was reversed at the appellate level by the United States Court of Appeals for the Sixth Circuit. The case was argued before the United States Supreme Court on November 9, 1993. Handing down its ruling on March 7, 1994, the court held that the appellate court placed too much emphasis on the commercial nature of the parody. The opinion of the appellate court was reversed and the case was remanded for further proceedings. Subsequently, the parties agreed to settle the case to avoid further legal expense.

References 

Defunct companies based in Tennessee
Music publishing companies of the United States
Ryman Hospitality Properties
Sony Music Publishing
2002 mergers and acquisitions